, S. 66, is a musical setting of the  hymn composed by Franz Liszt in 1885. It is written for an  SATB choir.

This is the only example of unaccompanied church music in Liszt's hand. It is also Liszt's last religious composition.

Set in F major and common time, it is marked  (slow) and is mostly marked  (soft), with contrasts within this dynamic spectrum. The text contains the first line of the hymn, with repetitions.

References

External links

L
1885 compositions
Compositions by Franz Liszt